Portland is an unincorporated community in Polk County, in the U.S. state of Georgia.

History
A post office called Portland was established in 1911, and remained in operation until it was discontinued in 1929. The community was named after the local Southern States Portland Cement Company, a manufacturer of Portland cement.

References

Unincorporated communities in Polk County, Georgia
Unincorporated communities in Georgia (U.S. state)